Clarence Skinner may refer to:

 Jerry Skinner (Clarence Farrington Skinner, 1900–1962), New Zealand politician
 Clarence Skinner (cricketer) (1900-1969), a Barbadian cricketer
 Clarence Skinner (minister) (1881–1949), Universalist minister and dean of Crane School of Theology